Olucak can refer to the following places in Turkey:

 Olucak, Cide
 Olucak, Feke
 Olucak, Kızılcahamam